Ludmila Zeman (born 23 April 1947) is a Czech–Canadian artist, animator, and creator of children's books. She is the daughter of filmmaker Karel Zeman.

Zeman was born in the Moravian Czech city of Zlín (renamed Gottwaldov in 1949, through 1989). She graduated from the college of art (Střední uměleckoprůmyslová škola) in Uherské Hradiště. She worked as her father's assistant for his final films, and married Eugen Spálený, the chief animator at his studio. They had two children, Linda and Malvinia. She launched a career in story books and animation for children.

In 1983, Zeman and her husband were invited to teach film technique at Emily Carr University of Art and Design in Vancouver. When the couple attempted to emigrate, the Czechoslovakian communist government refused them permission, accusing them of pro-Western leanings. Zeman was told to leave the animation studio, and Spálený was drafted into menial construction work. In the summer of 1984, the family escaped through Yugoslavia to a refugee camp in Austria, finally arriving in Canada to accept the teaching posts.

The Cedar Tree of Life, a thirty-second animated segment the couple produced for the Canadian edition of Sesame Street, attracted the attention of the National Film Board of Canada, which invited the couple to make a short film on a topic of their choice. Zeman's production was Lord of the Sky, based on myths of the Canadian north Pacific First Nations and produced using paper cutouts. The film was a success, winning eleven international awards, including a blue ribbon at the American Film Festival in 1993; it was shown at the Sundance Film Festival the following year and was shortlisted for an Academy Award nomination.

Following Lord of the Sky, Zeman and Spálený planned a feature-length animated film based on the Epic of Gilgamesh. Karel Zeman had introduced the epic, which was among his favorite books, to Ludmila when she was eleven. The concept was eventually developed into a trilogy of children's books written and illustrated by Zeman: Gilgamesh the King (1991), The Revenge of Ishtar (1993), and The Last Quest of Gilgamesh (1995). The final book in the trilogy won the 1995 Governor General's Award for Children's Illustration. The Embassy of Canada in Japan presented an exhibition of Ludmila Zeman's work in Tokyo in 2011.

References

External links
 

 

1947 births
Canadian children's book illustrators
Czech children's book illustrators
Czech animators
Czech film directors
Czech animated film directors
Czech animated film producers
Czech women film directors
Czech women film producers
Czechoslovak emigrants to Canada
Governor General's Award-winning children's illustrators
Czech women animators
Living people
Karel Zeman
People from Zlín